The following is a list of films originally produced and/or distributed theatrically by Metro-Goldwyn-Mayer and released between 2000 and 2009.

See also 
 Lists of Metro-Goldwyn-Mayer films

References 

2000-2009
American films by studio
2000s in American cinema
Lists of 2000s films